The Men's under-23 road race of the 2014 UCI Road World Championships took place in and around Ponferrada, Spain on 26 September 2014.

Following on from countryman Kurt Asle Arvesen in 1997, Sven Erik Bystrøm became only the second Norwegian rider to win the world title. He made a late break on the final climb, with around  remaining, and held off the peloton; he ultimately soloed to victory by seven seconds. Australia's Caleb Ewan won the field sprint for the silver medal, while Bystrøm's teammate Kristoffer Skjerping completed the podium with the bronze medal.

Qualification

Qualification was based on performances on the UCI run tours and the Men Under 23 Nations' Cup during 2014. Results from January to the middle of August counted towards the qualification criteria. In addition to this number, the current continental champions were also able to take part. The outgoing World Champion, Matej Mohorič, did not compete as he was no longer eligible – he moved to the UCI ProTeam  for the 2014 season.

Course
The race was held on the same circuit as the other road races and consisted of ten laps.

The first  were flat, after which the climb to Alto de Montearenas started, with an average gradient of 8%. After a few hundred metres the ascent flattened and the remaining  were at an average gradient of 3.5%. Next was a descent, with the steepest point after  at a 16% negative gradient.

Schedule
All times are in Central European Time (UTC+1).

Participating nations
162 cyclists from 42 nations took part in the men's under-23 road race. The number of cyclists per nation is shown in parentheses.

  Albania (2)
  Algeria (3)
  Australia (6)
  Austria (5)
  Azerbaijan (3)
  Belgium (6)
  Belarus (2)
  Brazil (2)
  Chile (2)
  Colombia (6)
  Costa Rica (1)
  Denmark (5)
  Eritrea (5)
  Finland (1)
  France (6)
  Great Britain (5)
  Germany (5)
  Ireland (3)
  Italy (5)
  Kazakhstan (6)
  Latvia (1)
  Luxembourg (3)
  Morocco (3)
  Moldova (1)
  Mexico (3)
  Netherlands (5)
  Norway (6)
  New Zealand (2)
  Poland (5)
  Portugal (4)
  Romania (2)
  Russia (6)
  Rwanda (3)
  Serbia (1)
  Slovakia (4)
  Slovenia (5)
  South Africa (4)
  Spain (5) (host)
  Switzerland (6)
  Turkey (5)
  United States (5)
  Venezuela (4)

Prize money
The UCI assigned premiums for the top 3 finishers with a total prize money of €8,049.

Final classification

References

Men's under-23 road race
UCI Road World Championships – Men's under-23 road race
2014 in men's road cycling